Acygnatha is a genus of moths of the family Noctuidae.

Species
Acygnatha atrapex (Hampson, 1895)
Acygnatha fasciata (Hampson, 1898)
Acygnatha mesozona Hampson, 1926
Acygnatha nigripuncta (Hampson, 1907)
Acygnatha stigmatilis (Hampson, 1898)
Acygnatha terminalis (Wileman, 1915)

References
Natural History Museum Lepidoptera genus database

Calpinae
Noctuoidea genera